Conus shikamai is a species of sea snail, a marine gastropod mollusk in the family Conidae, the cone snails and their allies.

Like all species within the genus Conus, these snails are predatory and venomous. They are capable of "stinging" humans, therefore live ones should be handled carefully or not at all.

Description
The size of the shell varies between 40 mm and 70 mm.

Distribution
This marine species occurs off Taiwan, the Philippines and Indonesia.

References

 Coomans, H. E., Moolenbeek, R. G., and Wils, E., 1985. Alphabetical revision of the (sub)species in recent Conidae 7. cingulatus to cylindraceus, including Conus shikamai nomen novum. Basteria, 48 (6 ): 223–311 
 Tucker J.K. & Tenorio M.J. (2009) Systematic classification of Recent and fossil conoidean gastropods. Hackenheim: Conchbooks. 296 pp
 Puillandre N., Duda T.F., Meyer C., Olivera B.M. & Bouchet P. (2015). One, four or 100 genera? A new classification of the cone snails. Journal of Molluscan Studies. 81: 1–23

External links
 The Conus Biodiversity website
 Cone Shells – Knights of the Sea
 

shikamai
Gastropods described in 1985